Thomas David Allen (born 4 September 1984 in Norwich, Norfolk) is a former motorcycle speedway rider from England. He rode for the Somerset Rebels in the Premier League.

Tommy won the Premier League Championship in 2005 with Rye House Rockets, and again in 2007. His brother Olly is also a professional rider.

References 

British speedway riders
English motorcycle racers
1984 births
Living people
Swindon Robins riders
Rye House Rockets riders
Mildenhall Fen Tigers riders